The  AIC Serie A Defender of the Year was a yearly award organized by the Italian Footballers' Association (AIC) from 2000 to 2010 as part of the Oscar del Calcio awards event, given to the defender who was considered to have performed the best over the previous Serie A season.

Since 2011, the best defenders are chosen as part of the Serie A Team of the Year award within the Gran Galà del Calcio awards event.

Winners

By club

References

External links
 List of Oscar del Calcio winners on the AIC official website
 List of Gran Galà del Calcio winners on the AIC official website

Serie A trophies and awards
Oscar del Calcio
Awards established in 2000
Lists of footballers in Italy
2000 establishments in Italy
Awards disestablished in 2010
2010 disestablishments in Italy
Association football player non-biographical articles